Otto Luyken (4 November 1884 – 3 February 1953) was director of the "Hesse Tree Nurseries" (Baumschulen Hesse) in Weener, Germany. He bred the cherry laurel (Prunus laurocerasus) variety named after him.

Life
Luyken was born in Siegen, Germany.  His parents were Emil Luyken (1845-1906) and Johanna Hesse (1848-1934). He went to school in Siegen and then began an apprenticeship as gardener in Belgium and England. After participating in World War I he started working at the "Hesse Tree Nurseries" in Weener which were owned by his mother's parents, and later became the director. Under his management the establishment won a high prestige. During World War II he was drafted again to military service for a long time and came back sick. He suffered from a dilated lung, and died in Weener. After his death the tree nurseries could not be kept in family's ownership.

The "Baumschulen Hesse" were founded 1879 by Hermann A. Hesse (1852-1937). The "Otto Luyken" cherry laurel was selected by the nursery in 1940 and introduced to trade in 1953 (Otto's death year).

Picture gallery

External links
 Otto Luyken's genealogy

1884 births
1953 deaths
German gardeners